Psalms is the first studio album by contemporary worship duo Shane & Shane. The album was released on June 4, 2002 by Inpop Records, and was self-produced.

Music and lyrics
Russ Breimeier of Christianity Today wrote, "if there's one word that leaps to mind when listening to Psalms, it's rhythmic," noting the "superb team of musicians, highlighted by an awesome rhythm section", and additionally praising the vocals, guitar work, and songwriting.

Critical reception

Psalms has received one review, and that one was positive. At Christianity Today, Russ Breimeier said that "Psalms is superb, a worship album truly outside the box that showcases smart songwriting and sublime musicianship all for the sake of connecting listeners with the Lord."

Commercial performance
For the week of June 15, 2002 music charts by Billboard, Psalms was on the genre charting Christian Albums in the No. 11 slot.

Track listing

Charts

References

2002 debut albums
Inpop Records albums
Shane & Shane albums